= East Mahé =

Region of Seychelles

East Mahé is a region of Seychelles.

== Mahe Island ==
Mahé is the largest island in the Seychelles archipelago, in the Indian Ocean off East Africa. Its terrain is defined by white-sand beaches such as those in the popular resort area of Beau Vallon, and granite peaks including the rainforested Morne Seychellois. The island is also home to Victoria, Seychelles' capital, known for Creole architecture and a colorful covered market with wares like fish, fruit and clothing.
